Sergei Vladimirovich Neyman (born 25 September 1967) is a former Soviet and Russian professional footballer.

Club career
He made his debut in the Soviet Top League in 1988 for FC Dinamo Moscow.

Honours
 Soviet Top League bronze: 1990.

References

External links
 Profile at Legioner (with photo)
 Stats from SLovenia at PrvaLiga.
 Stats from Croatia at HRrepka.

1967 births
Living people
Footballers from Saint Petersburg
Soviet footballers
Russian footballers
Association football defenders
FC Dynamo Moscow players
Real Betis players
FC Spartak Vladikavkaz players
Myllykosken Pallo −47 players
NK Beltinci players
NK Zadar players
FC Rotor Volgograd players
Bnei Yehuda Tel Aviv F.C. players
Soviet Top League players
Russian Premier League players
Croatian Football League players
Veikkausliiga players
Russian expatriate footballers
Soviet expatriate sportspeople in Spain
Expatriate footballers in Spain
Expatriate footballers in Finland
Expatriate footballers in Croatia
Expatriate footballers in Israel
Expatriate footballers in Slovenia
FC Dynamo Saint Petersburg players
FC Zenit Saint Petersburg players
FC Volga Ulyanovsk players